Brosnahan is an Irish surname. This surname is derived from the place of Brosna, County Kerry, in Ireland. Notable people with the surname include:

 James D. Brosnahan (born 1963), American politician
 Maureen Brosnahan, Canadian journalist
 Rachel Brosnahan (born 1990), American actress
 Seán Brosnahan (1911–1987), Irish independent politician

See also
 Brosnahan Island, an island of the Ross Dependency, Antarctica
 Kate Spade (born Katherine Noel Brosnahan)